Thornton's Corners GO Station is a planned GO Transit train station to be built by Metrolinx in the community of Oshawa, Ontario, as part of the approved expansion of train service on the Lakeshore East line to Bowmanville. The station would be located along a new spur line connecting the CNR rail corridor east of Oshawa GO Station to CP Rail's Belleville Subdivision further north.

, Metrolinx identifies this station by the name "Thornton Road East" rather than just "Thornton Road" on its website; the station name is still subject to change.

History
In 2011, Metrolinx proposed building the station at the northwest corner of the intersection of Thornton Road and Stellar Drive along a new spur line would have connected the Canadian National Railway (CNR) line west of Oshawa GO Station to the Canadian Pacific Railway (CPR) freight line north of the highway. By 2021, Metrolinx changed the location of the new spur to be east of Oshawa GO. Since the branch from the CNR line to the new spur line was shifted east of Oshawa GO, the station location at Thornton Road and Stellar Drive was no longer possible as the spur line would bypass that site.

Notes

References

External links
 GO Transit - Environmental Assessments
Transit Project Assessment Process (TPAP) Environmental Assessment (EA) and Preliminary Design Study: Oshawa to Bowmanville GO Train Service Expansion and Maintenance Facility, Report to the Development Services Committee (DS-10-40), City of Oshawa

Future GO Transit railway stations
Railway stations in Oshawa
Proposed railway stations in Canada